George Duncan (16 January 1937 – 4 February 2012) was a Scottish footballer who played as a winger.

Career
Duncan began his career at Scottish non-league club Kirkintilloch Rob Roy, before signing for Rangers in 1957. On 22 February 1958, Duncan made his Rangers debut in a 5–1 home win against Queen's Park. On 8 March 1958, Duncan scored his first goals for the club, scoring two in a 3–1 away win against Clyde.

Duncan eventually fell out of favour at Rangers, competing with Scotland international Alex Scott on the wing. Following a loan move to Raith Rovers, Duncan moved to England in 1960, signing for Southend United. On 26 December 1960, Duncan scored twice on his debut for Southend, in a 2–2 draw against Halifax Town. However, these goals would be Duncan's only for Southend and in August 1961, signed for Chesterfield. Duncan made 140 Football League appearances at Chesterfield, scoring 13 times, before moving onto Chelmsford City in 1965. Duncan remained at Chelmsford for two seasons, scoring four goals in 76 appearances, before moving onto Folkestone Town. Duncan's later career was spent at Cambridge City and Bury Town, as well as player-manager roles at Essex-based clubs Braintree & Crittall Athletic, Heybridge Swifts and Maldon Town.

References

1937 births
2012 deaths
Association football wingers
Scottish footballers
Footballers from Glasgow
Scottish football managers
Kirkintilloch Rob Roy F.C. players
Rangers F.C. players
Raith Rovers F.C. players
Southend United F.C. players
Chesterfield F.C. players
Chelmsford City F.C. players
Folkestone F.C. players
Cambridge City F.C. players
Bury Town F.C. players
Braintree Town F.C. players
Heybridge Swifts F.C. players
Maldon & Tiptree F.C. players
Braintree Town F.C. managers
Heybridge Swifts F.C. managers
Maldon & Tiptree F.C. managers
Scottish Football League players
Southern Football League players
English Football League players
Scottish Junior Football Association players